Torald Rein (born 22 October 1968) is a German, former cross-country skier who competed from 1992 to 2001. His best finish at the Winter Olympics was fourth in the 4 x 10 km relay at Lillehammer in 1994 while his best individual finish was 21st in the 10 km + 15 km combined pursuit at Albertville in 1992.

Rein's best finish at the FIS Nordic World Ski Championships was 32nd in the 10 km + 15 km combined pursuit at Falun in 1993. His best World Cup finish was 25th in a 30 km event in Canada in 1991.

Rein's only individual victory was in a 15 km Continental Cup event in Germany in 1997.

Cross-country skiing results
All results are sourced from the International Ski Federation (FIS).

Olympic Games

World Championships

World Cup

Season standings

References

External links 
 
 Olympic 4 x 10 km relay results: 1936-2002 

1968 births
Living people
Cross-country skiers at the 1992 Winter Olympics
Cross-country skiers at the 1994 Winter Olympics
Cross-country skiers at the 1998 Winter Olympics
German male cross-country skiers
Olympic cross-country skiers of Germany
People from Wernigerode
Sportspeople from Saxony-Anhalt